Deepak Dobriyal (born 1 September 1975) is an Indian film and theatre actor. He is recipient of a Filmfare Award. He worked in many Bollywood films such as Omkara (2006), Shaurya (2008), Tanu Weds Manu (2011), Dabangg 2 (2012), Chor Chor Super Chor (2013), Tanu Weds Manu Returns (2015), Prem Ratan Dhan Payo (2015), Hindi Medium (2017) and Angrezi Medium (2020).

Early life and education
Deepak Dobriyal was born on 1 September in Pauri Garhwal district in Uttarakhand. His parents are from Kabra village near Rithakhal and Satpuli village, Pauri Garhwal in Uttarakhand. Later, his family moved to Delhi when he was 5 years old. There, Deepak completed his studies at Govt. Boys Senior Secondary School Begumpur. 

In Delhi, he lived in Katwariya Saray. Dobriyal is married to Lara Bhalla.

Theatre career
He started his acting career in 1994 with eminent theatre director Arvind Gaur. His major plays with Gaur are Tughlaq, Andha Yug, Final Solutions, Desire Under the Elms, Rakt Kalyan, Court Martial, Dario Fo's Operation Three Star, The Caucasian Chalk Circle, The Good Person of Szechwan, Neil Simon's The Good Doctor and Ashok Lal's Ek Mamooli Aadmi. After six years with Asmita theatre, he joined Act One with director Pt. N. K. Sharma. He acted in Aao Saathi Sapna Dekhen, Hamaar Baabuji ki chhattri and Aksar Maine Socha Hai.

Film career
He has received recognition for his role in Omkara as "Rajju" and as a side-kick to the protagonist "Pappi" in Tanu Weds Manu  (2011), a role he reprised in 2015 sequel Tanu Weds Manu: Returns and again received critical acclaims.

Filmography

Awards and nominations

References

External links 
 
Deepak Dobriyal in Delhi-6 news

Indian male film actors
Male actors in Hindi cinema
Indian male stage actors
Living people
Male actors from Uttarakhand
Male actors from Delhi
Filmfare Awards winners
Screen Awards winners
1975 births